José Carlos Ballbe Sala (born 21 February 1985 in Terrassa) is a Spanish field hockey player.  At the 2012 Summer Olympics, he competed for the national team in the men's tournament.

References

External links 
 
 
 
 

1985 births
Living people
Spanish male field hockey players
Olympic field hockey players of Spain
Field hockey players at the 2012 Summer Olympics